The Cliffe Hill Mineral Railway was a  narrow gauge industrial railway that connected the Cliffe Hill granite quarry to the nearby London Midland and Scottish Railway (LMS) between Leicester and Coalville. The line opened in 1896 and operated until 1948.

History 

Granite is reputed to have been quarried from the outcrop near Markfield in Leicestershire since Roman times. However, it was not until the 1860s that quarrying began on a commercial scale. In the late 1870s two Birmingham businessmen opened a quarry at Cliffe Hill to provide street setts and kerb stones. This quarry closed in 1887 but was revived in 1889 by Mr. J. Rupert Fitzmaurice the son of one of the original owners. Fitzmaurice equipped the quarry with then modern machinery and it quickly became a commercial success.

In the first year of the new operation 630 tons of finished kerbs and 10,200 tons of broken stone were produced. In 1892 a traction engine was purchased to help transport stone to the railway.

Over the next few years demand for the company's products continued to increase and road transportation became a bottleneck to increasing production. The board decided to build its own railway line to move stone from the quarry to the nearest LMS line. The route to Bagworth Station would have required heavy gradients and passed over land owned by Mr. Breedon Everard, who was hostile to the notion of a railway. So the decision was made to build the line south from the quarry to a transshipment point at Beveridge Lane, near Bardon Hill station.

Construction started on the line in early 1896 and by the end of the year the first steam locomotive had been delivered and was at work.

The line from the quarry to the LMS's Cliffe Hill sidings remained substantially unchanged for the life of the railway, with the exception of an embankment built in 1911 to avoid steep gradients as the line crossed a small valley near Hillcroft farm.

The railway served its purpose for more than fifty years, employing a wide range of locomotives to move the granite trains. During the Second World War quarry production was reduced due to the lack of available workers. At the end of the war there was a boom in the housing and roads construction industries as wartime damage was repaired. This created a strong demand for the quarry's products. At the same time new quarrying and transportation machinery was becoming available and the company decided to reorganize production methods.

Within the quarry, lorries quickly replaced the internal railway, and by 1948 road transport was quickly replacing the need for the line between the quarry and the standard gauge railway. The decision was taken to abandon the Cliffe Hill Mineral Railway, and the last train ran in March of that year.

The track remained in situ for several years, and most of it was taken up in the mid 1950s.

 there are still obvious traces of the railway including a small section of track visible on the road crossing on Billa Barra Lane on the 90 degree bend, bits of track made into fence posts and the embankment between Billa Barra Lane and Stanton Lane

Locomotives

See also 
 British quarrying and mining narrow gauge railways

References 
 

2 ft gauge railways in England
Industrial railways in England
Railway lines opened in 1896
Railway lines closed in 1948
Rail transport in Leicestershire